Călugăreni may refer to several places in Romania:

 Călugăreni, a commune in Giurgiu County
 Călugăreni, a commune in Prahova County
 Călugăreni, a village in Dămienești Commune, Bacău County
 Călugăreni, a village in Felnac Commune, Arad County
 Călugăreni, a village in Ungureni Commune, Botoşani County
 Călugăreni, a village in Pantelimon Commune, Constanţa County
 Călugăreni, a village in Cobia Commune, Dâmboviţa County
 Călugăreni, a village in Conţeşti Commune, Dâmboviţa County
 Călugăreni, a village in Padeş Commune, Gorj County
 Călugăreni, a village in Mărtiniș Commune, Harghita County
 Călugăreni, a village in Eremitu Commune, Mureș County
 Călugăreni, a village in Poiana Teiului Commune, Neamţ County
 Călugăreni, a village in Adâncata Commune, Suceava County
 Călugăreni, a village in Ştefan cel Mare Commune, Vaslui County
 Călugăreni River
 Călugărenii Noi, Botoșani
 Călugărenii Vechi, Botoșani

See also 
 Călugărul River (disambiguation)
 Călugăreasa River (disambiguation)
 Călugărești, a village in Avram Iancu, Alba, Romania
 Călugăreasa, a village in Prigoria, Gorj County, Romania
 Călugăreanu, a surname
 Castra of Călugăreni, a Roman fort in Călugăreni, Mureş
 Battle of Călugăreni, a 1595 battle